Xubida is a genus of moths of the family Crambidae.

Species
Xubida chiloidellus (Barnes & McDunnough, 1913)
Xubida circumvagans (Dyar, 1922)
Xubida cretaceipars (Dyar, 1914)
Xubida delinqualis (Dyar, 1913)
Xubida dentilineatella (Barnes & McDunnough, 1913)
Xubida dentilineella Schaus, 1922
Xubida infusellus (Walker, 1863)
Xubida linearellus (Zeller, 1863)
Xubida lipan Klots, 1970
Xubida minorella Schaus, 1922
Xubida narinella Schaus, 1922
Xubida neogynaecella (Dyar, 1914)
Xubida panalope (Dyar, 1917)
Xubida punctilineella (Barnes & McDunnough, 1913)
Xubida puritellus (Kearfott, 1908)
Xubida relovae Klots, 1970
Xubida rutubella (Schaus, 1913)
Xubida thyonella (Schaus, 1913)
Xubida venadialis Schaus, 1922

References

Natural History Museum Lepidoptera genus database

Haimbachiini
Crambidae genera